Henri Joutel (c. 1643 – 1725), a French explorer and soldier, is known for his eyewitness history of the last North American expedition of René Robert Cavelier, Sieur de La Salle.

Joutel was born in Rouen.  After serving as a soldier, he joined La Salle's expedition and became the commander of La Salle's southern colony and base of operations in the New World at Fort Saint Louis (Texas). After the loss of the colony's ships, a mutiny, and La Salle's murder by others, in 1687–88, Joutel led members of the expedition back to France, going north, over land and river, by way of the Illinois Country to New France in what became Canada. Joutel's journal provides some of the earliest written information on the interior, natural history, and ethnography of central North America.

After Joutel returned to France, he became a guard at the city gates of Rouen.  He was unpersuaded by the Minister of Marine, Louis de Pontchartrain, to return to America but lent his journal.  The journal returned to the Gulf Coast in the Iberville expedition that finally established a lasting French presence near the mouth of the Mississippi River in 1699.

Notes

Resources
Henri Joutel, Joutel's Journal of La Salle's Last Voyage (London: Lintot, 1714; rpt., New York: Franklin, 1968). 
Pierre Margry, ed., Découvertes et établissements des Français dans l'ouest et dans le sud de l'Amérique septentrionale, 1614–1754 (6 vols., Paris: Jouast, 1876–86). 
Robert S. Weddle, The French Thorn: Rival Explorers in the Spanish Sea, 1682–1762 (College Station: Texas A&M University Press, 1991).

External links
Journal historique du dernier voyage que feu M. de La Sale fit dans le golfe de Mexique at HathiTrust
Joutel's journal of La Salle's last voyage, 1684–7 at Internet Archive

French explorers of North America
People of New France
1643 births
1725 deaths
Explorers of the United States
Explorers of Canada
French Texas
Military personnel from Rouen
1680s in New France
1680s in Texas
17th-century explorers
17th-century French military personnel